Perrotia albiplaga is a butterfly in the family Hesperiidae. It is found in northern and eastern Madagascar.

References

Butterflies described in 1916
Erionotini
Butterflies of Africa
Taxa named by Charles Oberthür